Here's George is a 1932 British comedy film directed by Redd Davis and featuring Pat Paterson, Syd Crossley and Merle Tottenham. It was adapted by Marriott Edgar from his own play The Service Flat. It was shot at Cricklewood Studios as a quota quickie.

Synopsis 
A young man tries to impress his prospective parents-in-law with his apartment full of labour-saving devices, which quickly go wrong causing chaos.

Cast
 George Clarke as 	George Muffitt
 Pat Paterson as 	Laura Wentworth
 Ruth Taylor as 	Mrs. Wentworth
 Marriott Edgar as Mr. Wentworth
Syd Crossley as 	Commissionaire
 Alfred Wellesley as Tenant
 Merle Tottenham as 	Perkins
 Wally Patch as 	Foeman
 Rene Ray as Telephonist

References

Bibliography
 Brian McFarlane. Lance Comfort. Manchester University Press, 1999.
 Wood, Linda. British Films, 1927-1939. British Film Institute, 1986.

External links

1932 films
Films directed by Redd Davis
British black-and-white films
Films shot at Cricklewood Studios
British films based on plays
Quota quickies
British comedy films
1932 comedy films
1930s English-language films
1930s British films